is a railway station in the city of Kanuma, Tochigi, Japan, operated by the East Japan Railway Company (JR East).

Lines

Station layout
The station consists of one island platform and one side platform, connected to the station building by a footbridge; however, one side of the island platform is not in operation.

Platforms

History
Kanuma Station opened on 1 June 1890. On 1 April 1987, the station came under the control of JR East with the privatization of the Japanese National Railways (JNR).

Passenger statistics
In fiscal 2019, the station was used by an average of 2064 passengers daily (boarding passengers only).

Surrounding area
Kanuma City Hall
Kanuma Post Office

See also
 List of railway stations in Japan

References

External links
 
  JR East Station information 

Railway stations in Tochigi Prefecture
Nikkō Line
Stations of East Japan Railway Company
Railway stations in Japan opened in 1890
Kanuma, Tochigi